Matteo Chinosi (born 14 February 1989) is an Italian racing driver.

Career

Karting
Matteo Chinosi began his kart racing career at the age of nine. In 2002 he won the International Winter Cup at Lonato (Brescia), the Champions Cup at Ottobiano (Pavia), the Torneo Industrie at San Pancrazio (Parma) and he finished third in the Italian Open Masters final standings in the ICA-J class.

Formula Renault
Chinosi began his single-seater racing car career by driving in the Italian Formula Renault Championship with Prema Powerteam in 2005. The following season, Chinosi competed in both the Formula Renault 2.0 Italy and Eurocup Formula Renault 2.0 championships for RP Motorsport. He finished ninth in the Italian series standings, taking nine points-scoring positions in fourteen races, including a podium in the first race at Hockenheim. In the Eurocup, he was a guest driver at Misano.

Formula Three
In 2007, Chinosi stepped up to the ATS Formel 3 Cup with the Ombra Racing team. He finished sixth in the standings after taking four podium places. Also he appeared as a guest driver at Monza in British Formula 3. Chinosi remained in the series for 2008 with Ombra Racing. He finished fifth in the standings with two wins at Hockenheim and the Nürburgring. Again, he was a guest driver at Monza in British Formula 3 where he gained a pole position.

Chinosi moved to Prema Powerteam and the Formula 3 Euro Series in 2009 but left the series after the Zandvoort round. During the same season he finished eleventh in the 2009 Masters of Formula 3 at Zandvoort.

Racing record

Career summary

† - As Chinosi was a guest driver, he was ineligible to score points.

References

External links
 Chinosi career statistics at Driver Database

Italian racing drivers
1989 births
Sportspeople from Pavia
Living people
Italian Formula Renault 2.0 drivers
Formula Renault Eurocup drivers
German Formula Three Championship drivers
British Formula Three Championship drivers
Formula 3 Euro Series drivers
Prema Powerteam drivers
Ombra Racing drivers
RP Motorsport drivers